John Potts Carter (2 October 1894 – 19 February 1960) was an Australian rules footballer who played with Fitzroy in the Victorian Football League (VFL).

Notes

External links 
		

1894 births
1960 deaths
Australian rules footballers from Melbourne
Fitzroy Football Club players
People from Murrumbeena, Victoria